Steffen Ewald Hamann (born 14 June 1981) is a former German professional basketball player. He played at the point guard position. Hamann was also a member of the German national basketball team.

Professional career
Hamann started his professional career in 1998 at Brose Baskets's development team TSV Tröster Breitengüßbach. One year later he was a member of the first team Brose Baskets where he played until 2006.

From 2006 to 2007 he played on season for Climamio Bologna in Italian Serie A. After his short stint in Italy he returned to Bamberg in January where he played the rest of the 2006–07 and 2007–08 seasons. In 2008 he joined Alba Berlin where he played until 2010.

In 2010 he signed with Bayern Munich and became the captain of the team. He played there until 2014. In his last season he led Bayern together with star player Malcolm Delaney to its first championship since 1955 and to the EuroLeague Top 16 stage. For those achievements the club retired his No. 6 after the season.

In his last professional season he played for Baunach Young Pikes in German second division ProA.

International career
Hamann, the former captain of the senior German national team, made his national team debut on 22 January 2003, in a game against Macedonia. He played at the 2003, 2007, 2009, and 2011 EuroBaskets; and at the 2006 and 2010 FIBA World Cups.

In 2008, he led the German team, together with 13-time NBA All-Star Dirk Nowitzki, to their first Summer Olympic Games since the 1992 Summer Olympics. In all competitions, he averaged 5.3 points, 1.8 rebounds, and 2 assists per game.

Career statistics

EuroLeague

|-
| style="text-align:left;"| 2005–06
| style="text-align:left;"| Bamberg
| 10 || 6 || 18.0 || .516 || .250 || .714 || 2.5 || 1.3 || .6 || .0 || 5.8 || 5.6
|-
| style="text-align:left;"| 2006–07
| style="text-align:left;"| Bologna
| 7 || 3 || 15.5 || .500 || .333 || .889 || 1.6 || 2.6 || .6 || .1 || 4.7 || 5.3
|-
| style="text-align:left;"| 2007–08
| style="text-align:left;"| Bamberg
| 14 || 14 || 26.9 || .471 || .324 || .758 || 1.9 || 2.6 || 1.1 || .2 || 8.7 || 6.9
|-
| style="text-align:left;"| 2008–09
| style="text-align:left;"| Alba Berlin
| 15 || 15 || 17.5 || .567 || .320 || .800 || 1.4 || 1.3 || 1.1 || .0 || 4.9 || 4.2
|-
| style="text-align:left;"| 2013–14
| style="text-align:left;"| Bayern
| 12 || 0 || 6.7 || .250 || .000 || .500 || .5 || 1.3 || .0 || .0 || .3 || .2
|- class="sortbottom"
| style="text-align:left;"| Career
| style="text-align:left;"|
| 58 || 38 || 17.4 || .497 || .304 || .755 || 1.6 || 1.8 || .7 || .1 || 5.0 || 4.5

External links
 Steffen Hamann at beko-bbl.de 
 Steffen Hamann at draftexpress.com
 Steffen Hamann at eurobasket.com
 Steffen Hamann at euroleague.net
 Steffen Hamann at fiba.com

1981 births
Living people
Alba Berlin players
Basketball players at the 2008 Summer Olympics
Brose Bamberg players
FC Bayern Munich basketball players
Fortitudo Pallacanestro Bologna players
German men's basketball players
Olympic basketball players of Germany
Sportspeople from Bamberg
Point guards
Shooting guards
2010 FIBA World Championship players
2006 FIBA World Championship players